Robert W. Glover (November 15, 1866 - March 29, 1956) was a teacher, postmaster, tax assessor, judge, state legislator, and Missionary Baptist pastor in Arkansas. He served in both houses of the Arkansas General Assembly.

Career
Glover was born in Grant County, Arkansas to William H. & Margarate C. Glover, a prominent family in the settlement of the county. He attended local schools, graduating from Sheridan High School. Following graduation Glover worked as a farmer and teacher for ten years before seeking public office. Glover served as Grant County Assessor from 1896 to 1900.

He served in the Arkansas House from 1905 to 1909. In 1907 he announced his campaign for senate. In 1909 he was elected to the Arkansas Senate representing the Ninth District, which included Grant, Saline and Hot Spring counties.

In 1909 he introduced the resolution calling for the establishment of four state agricultural colleges. He was appointed postmaster of Sheridan on April 4, 1917, and was elected county judge, serving from 1923 to 1925.

Family
His brother David Delano Glover was a U.S. congressman. His son Conrad Nathan Glover became a religious leader and wrote a memoir.

References

 

Members of the Arkansas House of Representatives
Arkansas state senators
People from Sheridan, Arkansas

1866 births
1956 deaths
20th-century American politicians
Baptists from Arkansas
Arkansas state court judges
Arkansas postmasters
Schoolteachers from Arkansas
20th-century American judges